Tony Walsh (30 November 1928 – 18 November 1984) was an Australian rules footballer who played with Carlton and Geelong in the Victorian Football League (VFL).

Notes

External links 

Tony Walsh's profile at Blueseum

1928 births
Carlton Football Club players
Geelong Football Club players
1984 deaths
Australian rules footballers from Victoria (Australia)
Geelong West Football Club players